Krapivnoye is a rural locality (a selo) in Shebekinsky District, Belgorod Oblast, Russia. The population was 684 as of 2010. There are 42 streets.

Geography 
Krapivnoye is located 7 km north of Shebekino (the district's administrative centre) by road. Shebekinsky is the nearest rural locality.

References 

Rural localities in Shebekinsky District